Herbert J. Muller (1905–1980) was an American historian, academic, government official and writer.  He received his education at Cornell University. He taught at Cornell, Purdue and Indiana University (1959-1980), served in the Department of State, the War Production Board, and frequently lectured abroad.

He is the author of The Uses of the Past, a sweeping inquiry into the lessons of history, focusing on Rome & Greece, Christianity & Judaism, the Byzantine empire, the Middle Ages, and Russia & China.

In 1973 Muller was one of the signers of the Humanist Manifesto II.

Herbert Muller's two sons are Richard and John.  His grandfather Otto Muller was the younger brother of Hermann J. Muller, the father of American geneticist Hermann Joseph Muller Jr.  Great-grandfather Nicholas Muller came to the United States from Germany in 1848 and with his brother Karl founded the Muller Art Metal Works.

Publications
 "Freedom in the Modern World," Harper & Row, 1966.
 "Freedom in the Western World: From the Dark Ages to the Rise of Democracy" Harper Colophon Books, 1964.
 "The Children of Frankenstein: a Primer on Modern Technology and Human Values."  Indiana University Press, 1970. 
 "Science and Criticism: The Humanistic Tradition in Contemporary Thought." Yale University Press, 1943.
 "The Loom of History."  Mentor-Omega/NAL, New York, 1961
 "Religion and Freedom in the Modern World", University of Chicago Press, 1963.
 "The Uses of English,"  Holt, Rinehart, and Winston,
 "The Uses of the Past: Profiles of Former Societies", Oxford University Press, 1952,  reissued by Textbook Publishers, 2003. 
 "Freedom in the Ancient World" Harper & Row, 1961
 "Adlai Stevenson: A Study in Values," Harper & Row, 1967.
 "The Spirit of Tragedy," Alfred A Knopf, 1956

References

Elof Axel Carlson, Genes, radiation, and society: the life and work of H.J. Muller (Ithaca, New York : Cornell University Press, 1981). 

1905 births
1980 deaths
Cornell University alumni
Cornell University faculty
Indiana University faculty
Purdue University faculty
20th-century American historians
20th-century American male writers
American male non-fiction writers